Star Reporter is a 1939 American film directed by Howard Bretherton, written by John T. Neville and starring Warren Hull, Marsha Hunt and Wallis Clark. It was released February 22, 1939.

Plot
Star Reporter, John Randolph (Warren Hull), with his fiancée, Barbara Burnette, (Marsha Hunt), has faith in her father, D.A. William Burnette (Wallis Clark), and throws the full weight of his newspaper behind him, in hopes of tracking down his own father's killer.

John is convinced that his father was murdered to stop him from revealing the organized crime bosses, in the city. Now, all he needs is proof. Just as he's about to get the goods on the criminal kingpin, lawyer Whittaker (Clay Clement), there is another murder.

Little does John suspect that the confessed killer, Joe Draper (Morgan Wallace) and his own mother, Mrs. Julia Randolph (Virginia Howell) have their own deep, dark secret, from the past: the true identity of her long, lost, already declared dead, husband; and, John's real father.

Whittaker and his mobsters will do anything to close the case. They're willing to shut anyone up permanently, who they can't buy off. John will stop at nothing, to see justice done, even when his own fiancée and Mother warn him that he might not be ready to handle the truth!

Cast 
Warren Hull as John Randolph, aka John Charles Benton
Marsha Hunt as Barbara Burnette
Wallis Clark as District Attorney William Burnette
Clay Clement as Whittaker
Morgan Wallace as Joe Draper, aka Charles Benton
Virginia Howell as Mrs. Julia Randolph
Paul Fix as Clipper
Joseph Crehan as Gordon, Newspaper Editor
Eddie Kane as Sam Grey
William Ruhl as Police Investigator Lane
Effie Anderson as Molly, D.A.'s Secretary
Lester Dorr as Reporter Wilkins
Monte Collins as Reporter Hogan
Denis Tankard as Mason, Burnette's Butler

References

External links 

1939 films
1939 romantic drama films
1939 crime drama films
American black-and-white films
Monogram Pictures films
American romantic drama films
1930s English-language films
1930s American films